Karin Johanne Bredland  (born 7 January 1978) is a retired Norwegian women's international footballer who plays as a midfielder. She is a member of the Norway women's national football team. She was part of the team at the 2003 FIFA Women's World Cup. On club level she played for Røa IL in Norway.

References

1978 births
Living people
People from Søgne
Norwegian women's footballers
Norway women's international footballers
Place of birth missing (living people)
2003 FIFA Women's World Cup players
Women's association football midfielders
Røa IL players